Frederick William Plaisted (July 26, 1865 – March 4, 1943) was an American politician and the 48th Governor of Maine.

Early life
Plaisted was born in Bangor, Maine, on July 26, 1865, the son of Sarah J. (Mason) Plaisted and Harris Plaisted, who served as governor from 1881 to 1883. He studied at local schools and at St. Johnsbury Academy in Vermont.  Plaisted established a career in publishing, and in 1889 succeeded his father as publisher and editor of The New Age newspaper in Augusta.  Plaisted also became active in the Sons of Union Veterans of the Civil War, and attained the honorary rank of lieutenant colonel after serving on the staff of the organization's national commander in the early 1890s.  Afterwards, he was frequently addressed in newspapers and other records as "Colonel" Plaisted.

Politics
Plaisted served as a delegate to the Democratic National Convention in 1896 and again in 1900.  He served as mayor of Augusta from 1906 to 1909 and again from 1910 to 1911.  He was the Kennebec County sheriff from 1907 to 1909, and was the first Democrat to hold the office.

Governor
Plaisted was the Democratic nominee for governor in 1910 and went on to win the general election, a rare statewide victory at a time when Maine was dominated by the Republican Party.  He served from January 4, 1911 to January 1, 1913, and was an unsuccessful candidate for reelection in 1912.  During Plaisted's administration, the state government proposed a local option change to the Maine law prohibiting the sale of alcoholic beverages, which was defeated in a popular referendum.  In 1912 he oversaw the forced eviction of a 45-member mixed-race community from Malaga Island in the town of Phippsburg.

Later life
After leaving the governorship, Plaisted was appointed postmaster of Augusta.  He served until 1923, when he retired and moved to Los Angeles, California.

Death and burial
Plaisted died in Los Angeles on March 4, 1943.  He was buried at Mount Hope Cemetery in Bangor.

Personal life
In 1907, Plaisted married Frances Gullifer, and they remained married until his death.

See also

Malaga Island

References

Sources
 Sobel, Robert and John Raimo. Biographical Directory of the Governors of the United States, 1789-1978. Greenwood Press, 1988.

External links
 

Democratic Party governors of Maine
Mayors of Augusta, Maine
Politicians from Bangor, Maine
American Congregationalists
Burials at Mount Hope Cemetery (Bangor, Maine)
1865 births
1943 deaths
Maine sheriffs
County officials in Maine
St. Johnsbury Academy alumni